Neighbours is an Australian television soap opera created by Reg Watson. It was first broadcast on the Seven Network on 18 March 1985. Neighbours began with twelve main characters which made up three households: the Ramsays', the Robinsons' and Des Clarke's. The following is an alphabetical list of all the regular characters and cast members that have appeared in the show. Recurring characters are not included in this list.

A

B

C

D

E

F

G

H

I

J

K

L

M

N

O

P

R

S

T

U

V

W

Y

References

External links
 Characters and cast at the Official Neighbours website
 Characters and cast at the Internet Movie Database

 
N
N